Oh Jae-il (Hangul: 오재일, Hanja: 吳在一; born October 29, 1986) is a South Korean professional baseball infielder for the Samsung Lions of the KBO League.

He won the MVP award in the 2017 playoffs against NC with four home runs and nine RBIs. He was the first to hit four home runs in a single game in the postseason and also broke his RBI record.

Oh won the 2019 Korean Series Most Valuable Player Award by hitting .333 (6-for-18) with a home run and six RBIs to help the Bears sweep the Kiwoom Heroes in four games.

References

External links
Career statistics and player information from the KBO League

Oh Jae-il at Doosan Bears Baseball Club 

1986 births
Living people
People from Guri
Sportspeople from Gyeonggi Province
Hyundai Unicorns players
Kiwoom Heroes players
Doosan Bears players
Samsung Lions players
KBO League infielders
South Korean baseball players
Korean Series MVPs
Baseball players at the 2020 Summer Olympics
Olympic baseball players of South Korea